Facundo Bagnis and Eduardo Schwank were the defending champions, but they did not participate this year.

Marcelo Demoliner and Miguel Ángel Reyes-Varela won the title, defeating Emilio Gómez and Roberto Maytín in the final, 6–1, 6–2.

Seeds

Draw

References
 Main Draw

Seguros Bolivar Open Cali - Doubles